Xanthippus corallipes, the red-shanked grasshopper, is a species of band-winged grasshopper in the family Acrididae. It is found in Central America and North America.

Subspecies
These seven subspecies belong to the species Xanthippus corallipes:
 Xanthippus corallipes affrictus b
 Xanthippus corallipes altivolus b
 Xanthippus corallipes buckelli b
 Xanthippus corallipes corallipes b
 Xanthippus corallipes latifasciatus b
 Xanthippus corallipes leprosus b
 Xanthippus corallipes pantherinus b
Data sources: i = ITIS, c = Catalogue of Life, g = GBIF, b = Bugguide.net

References

Further reading

External links

 

Oedipodinae
Insects described in 1852
Taxa named by Samuel Stehman Haldeman